is a Japanese professional baseball infielder for the Tokyo Yakult Swallows of Nippon Professional Baseball (NPB). Yamada made his NPB debut in 2012 with Yakult. He has won the Central League MVP award, has received the Best Nine Award six times, has been selected to six NPB All-Star Series appearances, and has a Japan Series championship. He has led the Central League in stolen bases three times and home runs once, hitting 30 home runs and stealing 30 bases in a single season on four occasions. In 2014 he broke the single season record for most hits by a Japanese right-hander in the NPB, and in 2015 became the first player in NPB history to lead his league in home runs and stolen bases in the same season. He has been compared to Mike Trout for his combination of power and speed.

Yamada has also played for the Japanese national team Samurai Japan. In 2014 and 2018, he won the MLB Japan All-Star Series with them. He has played for Japan in the WBSC Premier12 tournaments of 2015 and 2019, and was on the Japanese team during the 2017 World Baseball Classic. In 2021, he was selected to the host nation's team for the 2020 Tokyo Olympics, where he won both the gold medal and the MVP award.

Early life 
Yamada was born in Toyooka, Hyōgo Prefecture, Japan. His father, Tomonori, was a police officer who had competed in Shorinji Kempo in high school. As a child, Yamada did karate and gymnastics, and played soccer when he was in first grade. He started playing baseball as an outfielder in Takarazuka Little League when he was in second grade. After starting middle school, Yamada played for Hyōgo Itami, a team in the Japanese youth baseball organization Young League. He attended Riseisha High School in Toyonaka, Osaka with Takahiro Okada, and played in the Japanese High School Baseball Championship during his third year. In the 2010 Nippon Professional Baseball draft, Yamada was named by the Tokyo Yakult Swallows and the Orix Buffaloes. Yakult won the rights to his negotiation, and he signed with them for a 7.2 million yen contract on November 25, 2010.

Professional career

Tokyo Yakult Swallows 
Yamada did not play any regular season games with Yakult in 2011, but played in every game with the Eastern League farm team. He finished the season with a .259 batting average. His first NPB appearance was on November 3, 2011, when he started the second game of the Climax Series Final Stage against the Chunichi Dragons, in which he went 0-for-4.

2012-2014: Early career 
On April 5, 2012, at age 19, Yamada made his regular season NPB debut. He was limited to 24 games and hit one home run with a .250/.327/.364 in 49 plate appearances. In 2013, Yamada played in 94 games and improved his hitting performance, striking out 37 times and walking 39 times. He hit 3 home runs, stole 9 bases, and hit .283/.354/.357. In 2014, Yamada had a breakout season in his first full season as an everyday player. In 143 games, he hit 29 home runs, 39 doubles and 89 RBI, stole 15 bases and hit .324/.403/.539, and was named an All-Star for the first time in his career.

2015: MVP season 
In 2015, Yamada was named Central League MVP after leading the league in home runs (38), doubles (38), runs scored (119), and stolen bases (34). This marked the first time any NPB player led the league in home runs and stolen bases in the same year. He also notched 100 RBI and slashed .329/.416/.610, and was named an All-Star for the second straight season. In the Climax Series, Yakult beat the Yomiuri Giants to advance to the Japan Series for the first time since 2001. In game 3 of the Japan Series, Yamada hit home runs in three consecutive plate appearances. In assessing his MVP season in October 2015, the Japan Times wrote, "Yamada had a 2015 the likes of which is seldom seen in Japanese baseball."

2016-2020 
In 2016, he followed up his MVP campaign by hitting 38 home runs, 26 doubles, and 102 RBI. He also scored 102 runs, stole 30 bases, hit .304/.425/.607, and was named an All-Star for the third straight year. In 2017 with the team, Yamada batted .247/.364/.435 with 24 home runs and 78 RBI in 143 games with the team. In 2018, Yamada was selected to the 2018 NPB All-Star game, the fourth selection of his career. On the season, he hit .315/.432/.582 with 34 home runs and 89 RBI.

Yamada earned an All-Star appearance for the fifth time in his career in 2019, and finished the year with a .271/.401/.560 slash line and 35 home runs and 98 RBI in 142 games. In the COVID-19 pandemic delayed season in 2020, Yamada played in 94 games and logged a batting line of .254/.346/.419 with 12 home runs and 52 RBI.

2021: Japan Series Championship 
Yamada hit .269/.359/.561 with 25 home runs and 65 RBI in 79 games to begin the 2021 season, and was named an All-Star for the sixth time.

International career 
Yamada represented the Japan national baseball team in the 2014 MLB Japan All-Star Series, 2015 exhibition games against Europe, 2015 WBSC Premier12, 2016 exhibition games against Chinese Taipei, 2016 exhibition games against Mexico and Netherlands, 2017 World Baseball Classic, 2018 MLB Japan All-Star Series and 2019 WBSC Premier12.

On October 10, 2018, he was selected at the 2018 MLB Japan All-Star Series.

On October 1, 2019, he was selected to Team Japan for the 2019 WBSC Premier12.

In 2021, Yamada played for Team Japan at the 2020 Olympics in Tokyo. Overall, he went 7-for-20 with a home run and seven RBIs, starting in all five games the team played. He hit a 3-run home run in the third inning of a 7-4 win over Mexico. His bases-loaded double in the semifinal round against South Korea gave Japan a 5-2 lead, which they maintained and secured a spot in the final. In the gold medal match versus the United States, he scored the second of two runs in Japan's 2-0 victory. Yamada was named the Tokyo 2020 MVP by the World Baseball Softball Confederation.

References

External links

 NPB.com

1992 births
Living people
Nippon Professional Baseball MVP Award winners
Nippon Professional Baseball second basemen
Baseball people from Hyōgo Prefecture
Tokyo Yakult Swallows players
2015 WBSC Premier12 players
2017 World Baseball Classic players
2023 World Baseball Classic players
2019 WBSC Premier12 players
Baseball players at the 2020 Summer Olympics
Olympic baseball players of Japan
Olympic medalists in baseball
Olympic gold medalists for Japan
Medalists at the 2020 Summer Olympics
Japanese baseball players